The discography of Japanese-American R&B and pop singer Hikaru Utada consists of eleven studio albums, three compilation albums, eleven video albums and numerous singles and promotional singles. Utada began as a musician in the early 1990s as a member of U, a family unit made up of her, her mother Junko Utada, also known as 1970s enka singer Keiko Fuji, and her father, musical producer Teruzane Utada. U released their debut album Star in 1993, with the hope to debut in America. In 1996, the group was rebranded as Cubic U, an R&B project focusing on Hikaru Utada, resulting in the English language album Precious in 1998 with record label Toshiba EMI.

Utada continued releasing music with Toshiba EMI, debuting as a Japanese-language musician in December 1998 with the single "Automatic" / "Time Will Tell", and releasing her debut album First Love in 1999. The album was a phenomenal success, becoming the most sold album of all time in Japan. Her second album Distance was released on March 28, 2001, on the same day as singer Ayumi Hamasaki's compilation album A Best. Both sold over three million copies in their first week, becoming the respective highest and second highest selling albums in Japan in a single week.

Before the release of her third album Deep River (2002), Utada signed with American record label Island Def Jam and music corporation Universal to release English language globally. This resulted in her global debut album Exodus (2004), under the mononym Utada.

Utada returned to the Japanese market with her albums Ultra Blue (2006) and Heart Station (2008). Her song "Flavor of Life" (2007), the theme song for the drama Hana Yori Dango Returns, sold over eight million downloads, and became the second most downloaded song globally of 2007 after Avril Lavigne's "Girlfriend".

Utada released her second global English album This Is the One in 2009. After a compilation album featuring an extended play of new material, Utada Hikaru Single Collection Vol. 2 (2010), Utada went on an extended hiatus for personal reasons, however she briefly returned to release the song "Sakura Nagashi" for the animated film Evangelion: 3.0 You Can (Not) Redo (2012).

She made her official return in 2016 with the album Fantôme, again to commercial and critical success.

Albums

Studio albums

Compilation albums

Live albums

Other albums

Extended plays

Singles

As lead artist

As featured artist

Promotional singles

Other appearances

Video albums

Music video albums

Live concert video albums

Notes

References

Discography
Discographies of American artists
Discographies of Japanese artists
Pop music discographies
Rhythm and blues discographies